Megacraspedus argyroneurellus is a moth of the family Gelechiidae. It is found in Russia (Lower Volga, southern Ural), Ukraine (the Crimea), Central Asia, the northern Caucasus and Turkey.

References

Moths described in 1876
Megacraspedus
Insects of Turkey